A mambonsai , is a pop culture twist on the traditional Japanese art of  bonsai. Miniature plant scenes are supplemented with fanciful or kitschy art. Coined by Japanese mambo artist Paradise Yamamoto, the word is a portmanteau word combining mambo and bonsai.

"For centuries the Japanese have dwarfed trees in bonsai gardens which gained fame around the world. Now the delicate art is undergoing a revolution of sorts with some inspiration from Latin music, extraterrestrials and the realities of cramped apartments." — Yahoo/AFP

External links
The Art of Bonsai Project

Japanese art
Decorative arts
Bonsai